Late Night Tales: Groove Armada is a DJ mix album, mixed by Groove Armada, released as part of Late Night Tales / Another Late Night DJ series.

Track listing

 The Things That Dreams Are Made Of - The Human League  
 Love Is the Drug - Roxy Music  
 Glad to Know You - Kitty Grant
 Enjoy the Silence - Depeche Mode  
 Elle and Moi - Max Berlin
 Makin' a Living - The African Dream
 Roscoe (Beyond the Wizard's Sleeve Remix) - Midlake  
Get the Message - Electronic
 Son of Dragon - Liquid People  
 How Long - Ace
 Josephine - Chris Rea  
 Friday's Child - Will Young  
You're All I Need to Get By - Marvin Gaye & Tammi Terrell
Are 'Friends' Electric? - Groove Armada
 The Chills - Peter Bjorn & John  
Close to Me - The Cure
 Even After All - Finley Quaye 
 Happy Detective Pt.1 - Will Self

References

External links
www.independent.co.uk

Groove Armada
Groove Armada
2008 compilation albums